Yincun may refer to the following locations in China:

 Yincun, Longyao County (尹村镇), Hebei
 Yincun, Yuanshi County (因村镇), Hebei